Cold Heart or Cold Hearted could refer to:

 "Cold Heart" (Pnau remix), a 2021 song by Elton John and Dua Lipa
 Cold Heart (film),  a 2001 erotic thriller film
 A Cold Heart, a 2003 novel by Jonathan Kellerman
 "Cold Hearted", a 1989 song by Paula Abdul
 "Cold Hearted" (Seven Lions and Kill the Noise song), a 2017 song by Seven Lions and Kill the Noise

See also 
 
 
 Cold, Cold Heart (disambiguation)
 Coldheart (disambiguation)